Aerenea alvaradoi is a species of beetle in the family Cerambycidae. It was described by Prosen in 1947. It is known from Argentina.

References

Compsosomatini
Beetles described in 1947